The Prakasam Barrage stretches 1223.5 m across the Krishna River connecting Vijayawada, NTR and Mangalagiri Tadepalle Municipal Corporation, Guntur districts in Andhra Pradesh, India. The barrage serves also as a road bridge and spans over a lake. The three canals associated with the barrage run through the city of Vijayawada, crossing it and giving it a Venetian appearance.

The idea of constructing a dam across the river Krishna dates back to 1798. It began in the hands of captain Buckle and was revised in 1839 and 1841 by Captain Best and Captain Lake. After the endorsement of Major Cotton, the board of Directors of the East India Company approved it on 5 January 1850. The dam was started in 1852 and completed in 1855. It cost Rs 1.75 crore in those days and seems to have paid the then government a return of 18%. It used to irrigate 7 lakh acres.
Later, the State Government constructed a bridge that was named after Tanguturi Prakasam, the first Chief Minister of Andhra (a state formed in 1953, which later became Andhra Pradesh in 1956 after the merger of Telugu speaking districts of former Hyderabad State). Completed in 1957, it helps to irrigate over 1.2 million acres of land. This barrage also supplies water to Buckingham canal which was initially constructed as an inland navigation canal but was later used as an irrigation water supply canal. One of the first major irrigation projects of South India, the Prakasam Barrage in Vijayawada was completely successful in its mission.

Andhra Pradesh largely owes its rich agriculture to the Prakasam Barrage as the project facilitated the irrigation of large tracts of farmland. The Barrage provides views of the lake. It has become a tourist attraction of Vijayawada. On 13th Feb-2019 Andhra Pradesh chief minister Nara Chandrababu Naidu laid foundation to construct a new barrage named Vykuntapuram Barrage on the Krishna River nearly 25 km upstream of Prakasam Barrage.

Godavari Penna Linking

See also 
 List of dams and reservoirs in India
 Andhra Pradesh

References 

Barrages in India
Buildings and structures in Vijayawada
Tourist attractions in Guntur district
Dams completed in 1855
1855 establishments in India
Dams in Andhra Pradesh
Buildings and structures in Guntur district
Transport in Guntur district
Bridges and flyovers in Vijayawada
Tourist attractions in Vijayawada